Sultan Mahmoud (born 15 May 1935) is a Pakistani boxer. He competed at the 1960 Summer Olympics and the 1964 Summer Olympics.

References

1935 births
Living people
Pakistani male boxers
Olympic boxers of Pakistan
Boxers at the 1960 Summer Olympics
Boxers at the 1964 Summer Olympics
Sportspeople from Faisalabad
Asian Games medalists in boxing
Boxers at the 1958 Asian Games
Boxers at the 1962 Asian Games
Asian Games silver medalists for Pakistan
Medalists at the 1958 Asian Games
Middleweight boxers
20th-century Pakistani people